The 2016–17 Nevada Wolf Pack men's basketball team represented the University of Nevada, Reno during the 2016–17 NCAA Division I men's basketball season. The Wolf Pack, led by second-year head coach Eric Musselman, played their home games at the Lawlor Events Center in Reno, Nevada as members of the Mountain West Conference. They finished the season 28–7, 14–4 in Mountain West play to win the Mountain West regular season championship. They defeated Utah State, Fresno State, and Colorado State to win the Mountain West tournament championship. They received the conference's automatic bid to the NCAA tournament where they lost in the first round to Iowa State.

Previous season
The Wolf Pack finished the 2015–16 season 24–14, 10–8 in Mountain West play to finish in a tie for fourth place. They defeated New Mexico in the quarterfinals of the Mountain West tournament to advance to the semifinals where they lost to San Diego State. They were invited to the College Basketball Invitational where they defeated Montana, Eastern Washington, and Vermont to advance to the best-of-three finals series against Morehead State. They defeated Morehead State two games to one to become the CBI champions.

Departures

Incoming transfers

Recruiting

Recruiting class of 2017

Roster

Schedule

|-
!colspan=9 style=| Exhibition

|-
!colspan=9 style=| Non-conference regular season

|-
!colspan=9 style=| Mountain West regular season

|-
!colspan=9 style=| Mountain West tournament

|-
!colspan=9 style=| NCAA tournament

References

Nevada Wolf Pack men's basketball seasons
Nevada
Nevada
Nevada Wolf Pack
Nevada Wolf Pack